Rimmi is a village in Antsla Parish, Võru County in southeastern Estonia.

References

Villages in Võru County